Melfort may refer to:

Melfort, Saskatchewan, Canada
Melfort (electoral district), a former federal electoral district in Canada
Melfort (provincial electoral district), a provincial electoral district in Saskatchewan, Canada
Melfort, Zimbabwe

See also 
Earl of Melfort